James Gordon Meek (born 1968) is an American former ABC News producer and senior counterterrorism advisor of the U.S. House Committee on Homeland Security until his 2023 arrest by the FBI on charges of allegedly transporting images of child sexual abuse.

Career
Meek was the political editor of CD-ROM Magazine "Blender", which offered him accreditation with the Periodical Press Galleries in 1995. After leaving Blender in 1996, Meek and his partner Mike Rosenberg used the Gridlock webzine to apply for accreditation to the Senate Periodical Press Gallery. Still, they were denied because the webzine could not be the pair's primary source of income. 

Meek and Rosenberg then tried to found "Digital Culture Interactive News", which wrote stories about their Gridlock webzine, and he ended up sending submissions to Readers Digest and Ladies Home Journal for the money they sent readers who submit amusing anecdotes. He also started an unsuccessful "Spookhouse Media Services". On Election Night 1996, both Rosenberg and Meek were in the Bob Dole Media Center. He bemoaned in 2001 that he "has always been skilled at attracting unwarranted attention to himself".

Meek became a reporter for the New York Daily News covering national security and wrote several stories investigating the death of Dave Sharrett II, whose father had taught Meek at Langley High School. He left the Daily News in 2011 and worked as a senior counterterrorism investigator for the United States House Committee on Homeland Security where he investigated the Boston Marathon bombing. He joined ABC News in Washington as a senior investigative producer in 2013.

He appeared as a panelist at the Double Exposure Film Festival in 2021 related to his work on the documentary 3212 Un-redacted on the Tongo Tongo ambush.

Investigation and arrest
On April 27, 2022, Meek's home was raided by the FBI after they received a tip from Dropbox that child abuse materials were allegedly found in an account associated with Meek. They seized an iPhone and an external hard drive allegedly containing hundreds of images of child pornography. Meek was also accused of participating in group chats that traded child abuse materials. Investigators allegedly found that Meek engaged with minors on social media platforms, and one minor allegedly told authorities that Meek approached her through Snapchat and pressured her to provide sexually explicit photos. 

Following this raid, Meek "resigned very abruptly" from ABC News and public life. Rolling Stone reported that the investigation had allegedly found classified material, which originally raised questions whether the Biden administration was targeting Meek over leaked information.

On January 31, 2023, Meek was arrested and charged with transporting child pornography, which calls for a minimum of five years and up to 20 years in prison. Meek will remain in jail pending trial.

References

External links
 
 

1968 births
Living people
American journalists
ABC News people
People charged with sex crimes
Arlington County, Virginia